"Cut Me Down" is a song by British band Lloyd Cole and the Commotions, released in 1986 as the third single from their second studio album Easy Pieces. The song was written by Lloyd Cole and produced by Clive Langer and Alan Winstanley. It peaked at number 38 on the UK Singles Chart and remained in the top 75 for four weeks.

Background
In a 2009 interview with Time Out, Cole said, "'Cut Me Down' was a lovely song, just three chords, which was ruined by the arrangement we gave it."

Critical reception
Upon its release, Karen Swayne of Number One felt "Cut Me Down" was a welcome choice as a single after its "too-jaunty" predecessor "Lost Weekend". She commented, "It's a return to what he does best – all moody angst and careworn vocals alongside a dreamy beat." She added, "It may be too low key to win him any new supporters, but the bedsit brigade will be kept entertained." James Belsey of the Bristol Evening Post picked it as the newspaper's "single of the week" and described it as "subtle, elegantly thoughtful music with an infectious lilt".

Track listing
7–inch single (UK, Europe and Australasia)
"Cut Me Down" (Remix) – 4:18
"Are You Ready to Be Heartbroken?" (Live – September '85) – 2:50

7–inch limited edition double pack single (UK)
"Cut Me Down" (Remix) – 4:18
"Are You Ready to Be Heartbroken?" (Live – September '85) – 2:50
"Perfect Blue" (Instrumental) – 4:16
"Forest Fire" (Live – December '84) – 4:41

12-inch single (UK, Europe and Australasia)
"Cut Me Down" (Extended Remix) – 6:05
"Cut Me Down" (7" Remix) – 4:18
"Are You Ready to Be Heartbroken?" (Live) – 2:50
"Forest Fire" (Live) – 4:41

12-inch single (Canada)
"Cut Me Down" (Extended Remix) – 6:05
"Lost Weekend" (Extended Mix) – 4:20
"Forest Fire" (Live) – 4:23
"Perfect Skin" (Live) – 3:00

Personnel
Lloyd Cole and the Commotions
 Lloyd Cole – vocals, guitar
 Neil Clark – guitar
 Blair Cowan – keyboards
 Lawrence Donegan – bass
 Stephen Irvine – drums

Production
 Clive Langer – producer ("Cut Me Down", "Perfect Blue"), remixer ("Cut Me Down", "Perfect Blue")
 Alan Winstanley – producer ("Cut Me Down", "Perfect Blue"), remixer ("Cut Me Down", "Perfect Blue")
 Pete Dauncey – producer of "Are You Ready to Be Heartbroken? (Live)"
 Paul Nixon – producer of "Are You Ready to Be Heartbroken? (Live)"
 The Commotions – producers of "Forest Fire" (Live) and "Perfect Skin" (Live)

Other
 Peter Anderson – sleeve
 Clare Cameron – sleeve

Charts

References

1985 songs
1986 singles
Lloyd Cole songs
Songs written by Lloyd Cole
Song recordings produced by Clive Langer
Song recordings produced by Alan Winstanley
Polydor Records singles